The Armenian mafia is a general term for organized criminal gangs that consist of ethnic Armenians. In Armenia, the structure is organized in clans called akhperutyuns (եղբայրություններ, brotherhoods).

International activity

Germany
In 2009 and 2011, the German Federal Criminal Police Office (BKA) launched the investigation against the Armenian mafia in Germany. At that time there was a suspicion of drug trafficking, which could not be proven yet. In the meantime, the BKA found that there are at least two Armenian clans in Erfurt at war with each other.

On July 13, 2014, two men were badly injured when two clans got into an argument in which shots were fired in Erfurt. MDR Thüringen reported that after several months of investigations, the BKA arrested 31-year-old car dealer Arthur Z. and 26-year-old Karo S. on suspicion of drug trafficking, as during the raids, police discovered 35 kilograms of marijuana.

The shooting in Erfurt revealed the conspiratorial Armenian mafia group to the public. Shortly thereafter, the BKA, together with the six state police departments, set up the Fatil project, known as "Fight against thieves-in-law" and investigated the Armenian mafia covertly for three years. The Federal Intelligence Service and EUROPOL also participated in the Fatil project. The BKA's report on Fatil concluded that Armenian mafia really exists in Germany, possesses considerable financial resources together with other criminal groups from the former Soviet Union and poses a threat to the rule of law.

On 7 November 2018, German MDR TV prepared to broadcast a 30-minute documentary film called "Godfather in Germany: The Armenian Mafia and Thieves-In-Law” about the existence of the Armenian mafia and Armenia's Ambassador to Germany, Ashot Smbatyan's relations with the Armenian criminal groups. However, Smbatyan obtained a last-minute injunction from a Berlin court on November 6 that barred the broadcast of the documentary on November 7.

Instead of broadcasting 30-minute documentary, 7-minute video was broadcast which was about the activities of the Armenian mafia in Germany and investigations by the German Law Enforcement bodies. The joint investigation, by reporters from the news magazine Der Spiegel and MDR Television, revealed that German law enforcement agencies have been secretly monitoring the Armenian mafia in the country for years.

In March 2018, the Armenian ambassador to Germany, Ashot Smbatyan, offered assistance to the authorities in the fight against the Armenian mafia. However, the BKA declined his request. In a confidential letter from the BKA in March 2018, it says: Due to the possible "connection" of state structures with the "thieves-in-law", it is not recommended to have deep cooperation with Armenian authorities". In a secret file of the Federal Intelligence Service from the year of 2008, Smbatyan is referred to as "thieves in law".

German investigators suspected the boxing champion, Karo Murat, of participating in the Erfurt school shooting until his brother, Koko Murat, admitted to visiting the gaming club. However, according to the investigation, Karo Murat's mobile phone and car were there. Also, as reported by the German police, many of the participants in the Erfurt shootout used mobile phones registered with the boxer Arthur Abraham’s company in Berlin. Arthur Abraham, the famous German boxer, champion of Armenian origin, and who was also involved in the real estate business, did not comment on his connections with the suspects. In the ARD TV channel’s documentary titled "Exakt - die Story: Paten in Deutschland", Abraham is described as being one of the central figures of the Armenian mafia in Germany. Armenian criminal groups in Germany were particularly involved in drug trafficking, counterfeiting, gambling, and the organization of illegal migration. They also forged contacts with German politicians, such as with Manfred Grund, the Bundestag deputy from Thuringia from the CDU (the Christian Democratic Union of Germany). The deputy, among other things, visited Nagorno-Karabakh with another deputy from Thuringia from the CDU, Albert Weiler, who leads the German-Armenian Forum and also has links with Arthur Abraham and other alleged members of the Armenian mafia.

France
French Gendarmerie with on-the-field support of Europol targeted suspects across France believed to be part of an Armenian mafia group involved in large-scale poly-criminal activities, including cigarette smuggling, extortion and money laundering. Over 27 house searches were carried out in Rennes, Gap, St. Etienne, Nancy, Strasbourg, Haguenau, Reims, Chalon-Sur-Saône, Paris, Nantes, Limoges and Brest. As a result, 21 suspects were arrested, including an individual believed to be a high-ranking member of this mafia group. Some €23 000 in cash was seized at the premises, alongside over 2 000 packs of cigarettes, 23 kg of raw tobacco and 6 weapons.

In December 2018, the French police conducted an operation codenamed VORS 69-01 against a criminal syndicate operating in France and Belgium, which included Armenian and Georgian Mafiosi. The syndicate was involved in burglaries, drug trafficking, and document forgery. More than 300 police officers and aircraft were involved in the operation. Among those arrested were 9 Georgian citizens, two of whom were thieves in law.

Spain
Spain's Civil Guard  arrested 15 people in an investigation into tennis match-fixing by Armenian Mafia.  Europol released information that 11 house searches had been carried out in Spain in which 167,000 euros (£151,000) in cash were seized, along with a shotgun. It added that more than 50 electronic devices, credit cards, five luxury vehicles and documentation related to the case were also seized. Forty-two bank accounts have also been frozen.  Europol said in a statement that "A criminal group of Armenian individuals used a professional tennis player, who acted as the link between the gang and the rest of the criminal group". Spain's Civil Guard added that "once they got the bribe, the Armenian members went to the places where the matches were being played to make sure the player went through with what they had agreed, making the most of their imposing size". "Fifteen people have been detained, among them the leaders of the organisation, and 68 others have been investigated."

In 2018, National Police of Spain arrested 129 people from a Thief in Law Armenian criminal organization, and carried out 74 house searches. Among the criminals arrested were 7 Thieves in Law, who were involved into drug trafficking, arms trade, tobacco smuggling, money laundering, corruption in sports bookmaking, and other property crimes committed throughout Europe. The suspects have close ties with tennis, beach volleyball, basketball, and hockey players who were bribed in at least 20 sport matches. The organization also had strong ties with other criminals who live along Europe, and used several dummy companies for their money laundering purposes. According to Pedro Felicio, Chief of EUROPOL´s Economic and Property Crime, that would be "one of the biggest police hits ever to this kind of criminal organizations"

United States

In popular culture
 A fictionalized version of the Armenian Mafia, titled "Armenian Might", appeared in multiple seasons of the FX drama series The Shield, which starred Michael Chiklis as LAPD Detective Vic Mackey. In Season 6, German film actress Franka Potente appeared as Armenian Might shotcaller Diro Kesakhian, who routinely ordered the murders of the families of those who offend her. When one associate balks at this, Diro responds, "We can't separate the ones we love from the choices we make."

See also
 Armenian Power
 Russian mafia
 Thief in law
 Crime in Armenia
 Corruption in Armenia
Match fixing in tennis

References

Mafia
Organized crime by ethnic or national origin
Transnational organized crime
Organized crime groups in Armenia
Organised crime groups in Germany
Organized crime groups in France
Organized crime groups in Russia
Crime in the Soviet Union
Organised crime groups in Spain
Organized crime groups in the United States
Gangs in California